Juan Sebastián Vivanco (born April 14, 1990 in Quito) is a tennis player from Ecuador. He is a member of the 2011 Ecuadorian Davis Cup team.

References

Sources

Living people
1990 births
Ecuadorian male tennis players
Sportspeople from Quito